The Atomica Project is a trip hop band based in Chicago, Illinois.

Discography

Albums

Metropolitan (2005)
"One Day In New York City" - 4:12
"Delorian" - 3:25
"Larsen" - 4:26
"Salt" - 3:57
"Recent" - 3:20
"Quiver" - 4:04
"Bittersweet" - 4:02
"Sorrow" - 4:23
"Pollen" - 3:16
"Gun" - 4:22
"Worry" - 4:22

Grayscale (2008)
"When I Was Just A Young Girl" - 4:08
"Forecast" - 3:40
"Afraid" - 3:35
"Gravity" - 4:33
"Storm" - 3:40
"I Woke Up In This World" - 3:22
"Losing Sleep" - 3:41
"All The Loneliness In The World" - 4:13
"Into The Arms Of Strangers" - 3:56
"Evaporate" - 4:05
"The War Is Over" - 3:52
"Grayscale" - 3:24
"Gravity" (Iris Remix) - 5:28

The Non-Affair (2010)
"Damage" - 4:25
"The Devil" - 4:16
"Blur And Gray" - 3:55
"Mutiny" - 4:25
"Winter" - 4:11
"Tears In My Eyes" - 4:30
"Let's Find A Way" - 4:37
"We're In This Together" - 4:26
"The Buildings (As They Fall)" - 3:51
"Moviesong" - 3:24
"The Non Affair" - 4:06

Self Notes (2014)
"I Can Save Us" - 4:55
"A Night Like This" - 4:57
"Bitterways" - 4:52
"The Beauty" - 4:09
"Wartime" - 4:09
"Silver" - 3:49
"Faith" - 3:11
"Great Minds and Valentines" - 2:34
"Notes" - 3:18
"Black Water" - 4:20

EPs

1st in a Series of Dramatic Events (2009)
"Jetstreams" - 4:35
"Our Hero" - 3:39
"Oh, So Quickly" - 3:33
"Nuevo" - 4:00
"The Greatest Night" - 5:17

Overseas (2009)
"Hostage" - 3:29
"Little Dreams" - 4:14
"Tidalwaves" - 3:13
"The Obvious" - 4:05
"Recent" (Corey McCafferty Remix) - 3:19

Singles

Gravity (2008)
"Gravity" - 4:31
"Gravity" (Iris Remix) - 5:28
"Gravity" (Bounte Remix) - 5:52

The Beauty (2012)
"The Beauty" - 4:09

Misfired (2013)
"Misfired" - 4:09

External links
Official homepage

Musical groups from Chicago
Trip hop groups